Arthur Wallis may refer to:

A pseudonym of British actor and writer Nicholas Briggs
Arthur Wallis (Bible teacher)
Arthur Wallis (wrestler), British Olympic wrestler

See also
Art Wallace, American TV presenter